Swarm Technologies, Inc. is a private company building a low Earth orbit satellite constellation for communications with Internet of things (IoT) devices using a store and forward design. Social Capital incubated Swarm, Craft Ventures was an early investor. On 16 July 2021, Swarm entered into an agreement to become a direct wholly-owned subsidiary of SpaceX.

In-Q-Tel, the venture capital arm of the CIA, lists Swarm Technologies as one of their startups.

They have a Federal Communications Commission (FCC) licence for low bandwidth communications satellites in low Earth orbit.

In 2018, Swarm became the first U.S. company found to have deployed satellites without regulatory approval after an FCC investigation into the startup's launch on an Indian PSLV rocket of its first four picosatellites in January that year.

By December 2020, Swarm had launched 9 test satellites and 36 of a planned 150 low Earth orbit satellites to provide communication with IOT devices.

In February 2021, Swarm announced that its commercial services were now live using 72 commercial satellites providing its global low cost data to customers.

The Swarm Tile is its dedicated satellite two-way data modem designed to be low energy and embedded on the PCB of third-party products. Other products include a data plan and development kit.

History 
Swarm Technologies was founded in 2016 by Sara Spangelo and Benjamin Longmier, former employees of Google and Apple respectively.

The company became widely known in industry circles after illegally launching its first four test satellites in 2018. The responsible US regulatory authority FCC had refused the license for the start-up because they feared that the satellites could be too small to be recognized by the space surveillance systems. They could then become particularly dangerous, since "invisible" space debris. Despite this, the satellites, along with around 30 other payloads, were launched on an Indian PSLV rocket. The FCC imposed a $900,000 fine for this. The housing of the next test satellites was then enlarged. Together with correspondingly enlarged radar reflectors and a GPS-based position transmitter, the necessary traceability and thus also licensing was achieved.

The construction of the actual constellation began with the launch of twelve third-generation SpaceBEEs on September 3, 2020, on a European Vega rocket. After an additional 48 SpaceBEE satellites were launched by the end of January 2021, commercial operations of the constellation began.

Technology and use 
The third-generation SpaceBEE satellites weigh around 400 grams and, like the first generation, have a 0.25U CubeSat format; according to the manufacturer, they are about 11 × 11 × 2.8 centimeters in size. The second generation are 1U cubesats. Solar cells for the power supply are located on the top and bottom. The antenna for communication with the ground stations is wrapped around the satellite when it is launched and unfolds after it has been released into space. The data exchange takes place in a relatively small bandwidth, on the one hand with the end devices and on the other hand with ground stations that are connected to the Internet. After completion of the constellation, at least three satellites should always be reachable from any point on earth.

Swarm Technologies offers data transfer plans starting at $60 per year per connected device. At this price, 750 data packets of 192 bytes each can be transmitted monthly.

2018 Controversy and fine 

As a US corporation, Swarm has to follow US space regulatory procedures. In April 2017, Swarm applied for FCC permission for an experimental radio service license for its initial picosatellites. The FCC rejected the application in December 2017 due to concerns on tracking because of the very small size of the satellites (measuring at 0.25U CubeSat size) but they were launched from India the following month.

After the launch was reported, an authorized April 2018 launch of more satellites was immediately delayed when FCC permission was withdrawn. An FCC investigation found that not only had Swarm launched the four unauthorized satellites, it had also unlawfully transmitted signals between them and earth stations in Georgia. The investigation also discovered that Swarm had performed various other equipment tests before the launch without required FCC authorizations, including between weather balloons and ground stations.

Industry reaction was also highly negative, fearing not only disruption from uncoordinated activity but also enhanced future regulation. Spaceflight Inc., which had arranged the Indian launch as a rideshare, changed its processes to check that customers had the proper licenses.

The settlement required Swarm to pay a penalty of $900,000 and to follow a strict compliance plan to prevent future violations. This included submitting additional details to the FCC at least 45 days before a planned launch for the next three years.

While it was noted that the fine was still relatively small, it was increased from an initial amount agreed between the company and the FCC Enforcement Bureau. An FCC Commissioner observed that the negative publicity would probably prevent repetitions by Swarm or others.

Satellite constellation 

 SpaceBEE are a constellation of picosatellites, predominantly in the CubeSat 0.25U form factor, intended to reach a quantity of 150. SpaceBEE test models 5 to 9 were larger to assuage concerns about radar tracking. Swarm's website says satellites have a mass of 400 g and measure 110 × 110 × 28 mm.

References

External links 
 

Companies based in Palo Alto, California
Aerospace companies of the United States